The Desert Hawk is a 1944 Columbia film serial. It was the 23rd serial produced by Columbia. Gilbert Roland played a dual role in this serial, that of Kasim, The Desert Hawk and also Hassan, his own evil twin brother. Co-stars included serial regulars Charles Middleton, Frank Lackteen and I. Stanford Jolley.

Plot
The sinister Hassan starts plotting against the recently crowned Caliph, his twin brother Kasim. The evil twin engages the help of Faud who sends his man to the palace to kidnap the Caliph and murder him. These henchmen enter the palace and wound Kasim who manages to escape. A beggar named Omar finds him and cares for him until his health is restored. By the time the wounded Kasim recovers his brother has taken over the throne and plans to marry Princess Azala the daughter of the Emir of Telif who does not know that the current Caliph is an impostor. Kasim decides to fight for the throne and the princess after he finds a suit of chainmail displaying a hawk on the front.

Cast

Production
The Desert Hawk is a "western" set in the Middle East with swashbuckling elements.

Critical reception
According to reviewer William Cline, Gilbert Roland was "superbly convincing as the dashing Hawk, and made memorable an otherwise routine thriller."

Chapter titles
 The Twin Brothers
 The Evil Eye
 The Mark of the Scimitar
 A Caliph's Treachery
 The Secret of the Palace
 The Feast of the Beggars
 Double Jeopardy
 The Slave Traders
 The Underground River
 The Fateful Wheel
 The Mystery of the Mosque
 The Hand of Vengeance
 Swords of Fate
 The Wizard's Story
 The Triumph of Kasim
Source:

See also
 List of American films of 1944
List of film serials by year
List of film serials by studio

References

External links
 

1944 films
1940s English-language films
American black-and-white films
Columbia Pictures film serials
Films directed by B. Reeves Eason
1944 adventure films
American adventure films
1940s American films